The abbreviation DPV may have the following meanings.

 Deutscher Pressevertrieb, a German full-service distributor for the worldwide distribution of media products
 Democratic Party of Virginia
 Diver Propulsion Vehicle, an item of diving equipment
 Delegated Path Validation, a computing term
 Desert Patrol Vehicle, a military vehicle
 Deutscher Pfadfinderverband
 Differential pulse voltammetry, a chemistry method
 Dynamically Positioned Vessel, a ship which can automatically hold a position using its own thrusters and propellers
 Delivery Point Validation, an address validation process

 Ala-korpelan pajamiesten laatustandardi dpv = Design päin vittua